Venkatampalle is a village in Vajrakarur mandal in Anantapur District in the Indian state of Andhra Pradesh. Rajampet is the nearest town to Utukuru Venkatampalle  it had a population of 2,782 in 501 households.

Geography
Venkatampalli is noted for diamonds. This is a small village with a population of 1100. Many people visit the forest in search of diamonds. 
In the 1990s, an Australian company took land to seek diamonds.

Sri Jarutla Ramaligeswara Swami temple is famous which is 5 km from Venkatampalli.

Demographics
According to Indian census, 2001, the demographic details of Venkatampalle village is as follows:
 Total Population: 	2,782 in 501 Households.
 Male Population: 	1,440 and Female Population: 	1,342
 Children Under 6-years of age: 454 (Boys - 	227 and Girls - 227
 Total Literates: 	909

History
This village originated in the 1890s with a couple of families. Some tribes joined the village after ten years. The village was divided into three parts after some years (Venkatampalli, VPC Thanda, VPP Thanda).

Earlier this panchayat consisted of Venkatampalli, VPC Thanda and VPP Thanda. In 1997 it was divided into two panchayats: Venkatampalli and VPP Thanda.

List of sarpanch's for Venkatampalli from 1997:

 1. Vijaya simha (1997–2002)
 2. Badhru Naik (2002–2007)
 3. Arjun (2007 to 2013)
 4. Pothula Rathnamma (2013 to )

References 

Villages in Anantapur district